The Fort Santo António of Ibo (Fortaleza de Santo António do Ibo in Portuguese) is the most recent of the three forts built by the Portuguese Empire on Ibo Island, Cabo Delgado Province in Mozambique.

History

The fort was built in 1819 and funded by the Portuguese inhabitants of the town. Among the enemies of the settlement were Sakalava pirates from Madagascar.

It is a small fort, bearing a square shape, 16,75 meters wide and 17,35 meters long, the walls 1,93 meters high, and the parapet 1,43 meters high, while containing a tower 3,5 meters high which rises in the center of the fort, 7,58 meters wide and 7,64 meters deep, topped by a mast meant to fly a flag. It was restored in 1847 by order of governor Ferrari, who had a stone inscription placed on the fort which reads: "Made in 1847 by T. V. N. Ferrari, Gov. of These Islands". 

It was heavily armed, with 19 guns: 11 in the walls and 8 in the tower.

Gallery

See also
 Portuguese Mozambique
 Quirimbas Islands
 Fort São José (Ibo)
 Fort São João Baptista (Ibo)

References

18th-century fortifications
Forts in Mozambique
Portuguese forts
Buildings and structures in Cabo Delgado Province
Tourist attractions in Cabo Delgado Province
Portuguese colonial architecture in Mozambique